Matías Pérez may refer to:
Matías Pérez García (born 1984), Argentine footballer
Matías Pérez (footballer, born 1985), Uruguayan footballer
Matías Rodrigo Pérez (born 1994), Paraguayan footballer
Matías Pérez Acuña (born 1994), Argentine footballer
Matías Pérez (footballer, born 1999), Argentine footballer
Matías Pérez (balloonist), Portuguese-born Cuban balloonist